Princess Mary is a 1955 Soviet comedy film directed by Isidor Annensky.

Plot 
Pechorin learns that his friend Grushnitsky is in love with Princess Mary Ligovskaya and he attracts her attention.

Starring 
 Anatoliy Verbitskiy as Pechorin (as A. Verbitskiy)
 K. Sanova as princess Mary
 Karina Shmarinova	
 Leonid Gubanov as Grushnitskiy (as L. Gubanov)
 Mikhail Astangov as Verner (as M. Astangov)
 Klavdiya Yelanskaya as Ligovskaya (as K. Yelanskaya)
 Tatyana Piletskaya as Vera (as T. Pileskaya)
 Vitali Politseymako as Dragunskiy kapitan (as V. Politseymako)
 Fyodor Nikitin as husband of Vera
 Arutyun Akopyan as Alfelbaum (as A. Akopyan)
 Georgiy Georgiu as Rayevich (as G. Georgiu)
 Dmitriy Kara-Dmitriev as servant
 Viktor Koltsov as 
 Konstantin Nemolyayev as officer
 Tatyana Pankova
 Konstantin Mikhaylov

References

External links 
 

1955 films
1950s Russian-language films
Soviet comedy films
1955 comedy films